The Brian Pern documentaries are a British comedy spoof-documentary series about a fictional ageing rock star, Brian Pern, the former frontman of the 1970s progressive rock group Thotch. The series is written by Rhys Thomas and Simon Day, and stars Day as Pern, with Michael Kitchen, Paul Whitehouse and Nigel Havers in supporting roles.

Brian Pern, described by Radio Times as "an affectionate parody of Peter Gabriel, with a dash of Brian Eno", originated as a character for a web series. Subsequently transferred to television, the first series, titled The Life of Rock with Brian Pern, was originally broadcast in three weekly parts on BBC Four from 10 February 2014. A second series of three episodes was promoted to BBC Two and broadcast from 9 December 2014, retitled Brian Pern: A Life in Rock. A third series of three episodes, Brian Pern: 45 Years of Prog and Roll, was broadcast on BBC Four from 14 January 2016. A spoof Christmas song ‘Wish I Was At Home With My Missus' was based on the WW1 Christmas Truce.

Cast

Main cast
Simon Day as Brian Pern
Michael Kitchen as John Farrow
Rhys Thomas as Rhys Thomas OBE (and other characters)
Paul Whitehouse as Pat Quid (lead guitarist in the band)
Nigel Havers as Tony Pebblé (keyboards in the band)
Lucy Montgomery as Pepita Sanchez (and other characters)

Recurring cast
Tony Way as Ned Pankhurst
David Cummings as John
Philip Pope as Mike Phillips
Peter Gabriel as himself

Guest cast
Vic Reeves as Dermot O'Hare
Bob Mortimer as Dermot Mulligan
Matt Lucas as Ray Thomas
Anna Maxwell Martin as Jess Hunt
Danny John-Jules as Nigel Rogers (based on Nile Rodgers)
Kevin Eldon as Lennie Monkton
Michael Smiley as Micky Murray
Frances Barber as Wendy Mankiewicz
Al Murray as Jon Westmore (Series 1) / Eddie Mount: Drummer (Series 2)
Tom Davis as Russian Wembley Arena Security Guard
Christopher Eccleston as Luke Dunmore
Suranne Jones as Astrid Maddox Pern
John Thomson as Perry Boothe
Jane Asher as Cindy Pern
Adam Longworth as Tallow Pern
Shelley Longworth as Ripple Pern
Denis Lawson as Barry Patmoor
Alan Ford as 'Big' Basil Steel
Simon Callow as Bennet St John
Craig Christiaens as Brian's Drummer
Peter Bowles as Mr. Pern
Angela Thorne as Mrs. Susan Pern

In addition to Gabriel's cameos, the series features a range of musicians playing themselves including Roger Taylor, Phil Collins, Jools Holland, Rick Wakeman, Rick Parfitt, Chrissie Hynde, Tim Rice, Billy Bragg, Roy Wood, Paul Young, Mark King, Noddy Holder, Martin Kemp, Melanie C, Chas Hodges, Dave Peacock and Mike Batt.

The following actors and television or radio personalities have appeared as themselves in guest roles: Roger Moore, David Arnold, David Baddiel, Noel Edmonds, Miranda Sawyer, John Humphrys, Dan Cruickshank, Mike Read, Jack Whitehall, Martin Freeman, Kathy Burke, Alex Jones, Dan Snow, Matthew Wright, Alan Yentob, Paul Gambaccini, Tony Blackburn, Simon McCoy, Annie Nightingale, Dermot O'Leary, Kirsty Young and Ian Wright.

Production
The commissioning of the series was announced by  Janice Hadlow on 22 August 2013 at the Edinburgh International Television Festival under the name of Rock Ratatouille.

Origins

Comedian Rhys Thomas created the character of Brian Pern in 2008 when he was asked by BBC Comedy commissioner Simon Lupton to come up with an idea for the first batch of Online-Exclusive comedy sketches the BBC Comedy Website was developing. A fan of Peter Gabriel, Thomas was a frequent visitor to Gabriel's website where the singer would post a monthly video blog about his current projects.  At this time other rock musicians from the same generation were doing the same, such as Brian May and Brian Eno. In the series, Pern states that he "invented world music" (a reference to WOMAD) and was "the first musician to use Plasticine in videos" (a reference to Gabriel's song "Sledgehammer"). "There is more than one influence in that character," Gabriel told Mark Blake of Q, "but I am definitely one of them. I'm flattered by it."

Once the idea was commissioned, Thomas approached his fellow Fast Show and Down the Line collaborator Simon Day to play Brian Pern. Day was also a fan of Gabriel. Following a successful run on BBC Online,  a second batch of sketches were commissioned. With a small increase in budget, extra cast members were brought in: Lucy Montgomery as Majita (who would later become Pepita in the TV series) and Paul Whitehouse as guitarist Pat Quid (Thomas later cited he got the name from Stacy Keach's character in Roadgames). The relationship between Pat and Brian is based on that of David Gilmour and Roger Waters.

Thomas created the part of Brian's manager John Farrow for Michael Kitchen. Thomas had been developing a comedy drama for BBC One with Kitchen and offered him the part in the second series of online specials of Brian Pern. Thomas has stated in various interviews that John Farrow is an exaggerated version of Queen manager Jim Beach, whom Thomas had worked with for many years following his involvement with the band.

Reception
Reviewing the second series, Brian Pern: A Life in Rock, Michael Hogan of The Daily Telegraph believed that "the observational material had bite but lost its cutting edge by forcing itself into a sitcom framework." Andrew Billen of The Times thought that "the first of this three-part returning comedy certainly had its very funny moments, but was it really necessary?" Ellen E. Jones of The Independent considered it to be a "very astute, very funny spoof of fêted rock'n'roll royalty, money grabbing 'creative' projects and BBC arts documentaries in general." Matt Baylis of the Daily Express commented "there's a sense of the BBC laughing at itself so other people don't have to. I'm not sure it should get off that lightly."

Episode list

Series 1 - The Life of Rock with Brian Pern

Series 2 - Brian Pern: A Life in Rock

Series 3 - Brian Pern: 45 Years of Prog and Roll

A Tribute - At the BBC

References

External links
 
 
 
 
 

BBC television comedy
2014 British television series debuts
2017 British television series endings
2010s British comedy television series
Television shows set in the United Kingdom
English-language television shows
British parody television series
British music television shows